Tulskaya is a station of the Serpukhovsko-Timiryazevskaya Line of the Moscow Metro. It was opened in 1983 as part of the pilot stage of the line. The station is a single vault located underneath the Tulskaya square, named after the city of Tula.

Moscow Metro stations
Railway stations in Russia opened in 1983
Serpukhovsko-Timiryazevskaya Line
Railway stations located underground in Russia